Mullandrum is a village in Tiruvanamalai district in the state of Tamil Nadu, India. The postal code of Mullandrum is 632512. The name "Mulladrum" is derived from Mullai Vanam. Also called as "Mulladhiram".

Geography

About Mullandram 
Mullandram is a village in Arani Taluk in Tiruvannamalai District of Tamil Nadu State, India. It is located  towards North from District headquarters Thiruvannamalai,  from Arani.

Postal head office is Timiri .

Vettiyantholuvam , Morappanthangal, Sirumur , Athimalaipatt , Ariyapadi  are the nearby Villages to Mullandram. Mullandram is surrounded by Kaniyambadi Taluk towards west, Arcot Taluk towards North, Arani Taluk towards South, West Arani Taluk towards South .

Arcot, Vellore, Tiruvethipuram, Polur are the nearby Cities to Mullandram.	

This Place is in the border of the Tiruvannamalai District and Vellore District. Vellore District Timiri is East towards this place .

Demographics of Mullandram 
Tamil is the Local Language here.

By Rail 
However Katpadi junction Rail Way Station is major railway station  near to Mullandram
Next railway station near to mullandram is Wallajah road junction.

Colleges near Mullandram 
 Arunachala College Of Engineering For Women
 Malankara Catholic College
 Dr. M.G.R Chokalingam Arts College
 Sniit Computer College Academy
 Sri Balaji Chockalingam Engineering College

Schools in Mullandram 
 Government Higher Secondary School
 Sri Saraswathi Vidya Mandir
 Government Elementary School
 Government Anganvadi School
 A.C.S Matriculation Higher Secondary School

Temples in Mulladrum 
 Sri Renuga Devi
 Ishwaran Temple
 Perumal Temple
Yogalingeshwarar Temple, KK Thoppu

Grocery Shop in Mullandram 
 Raja Grocery Shop
 Murugan Grocery Shop
 Durairaj Grocery Shop
 Standard Cold Pressed Oil Shop
 Gajendriran Grocery Shop ( Mullandram Colony )
 Kumar Grocery Shop ( Mullandram Colony )

Flour Mills  In Mullandram 
 Om Sakthi Flour Mill ( Mullanram Colony )

Studios In Mullandram 
 Sri Venkateswara CSC Centre

Villages in Tiruvannamalai district